Rolf Hädrich (24 April 1931 – 29 October 2000) was a German film director and screenwriter. He directed 39 films between 1958 and 1989. His film Verspätung in Marienborn (US title: Stop Train 349) was entered into the 13th Berlin International Film Festival.

Selected filmography

Film
 Stop Train 349 (1963)
 Among the Cinders (1983)

Television
 Der Dank der Unterwelt (1958) — (remake of Berkely Mather's Tales from Soho: Slippy Fives, 1956)
 Die Abwerbung (1958) — (screenplay by Erich Kuby)
 Das Rennen (1959) — (based on the play Sammy by Ken Hughes)
 Ein unbeschriebenes Blatt (1959) — (based on a play by Jean-Pierre Conty)
 Kopfgeld (1959) — (screenplay by )
 Die Gerechten (1959) — (based on The Just Assassins)
 Die Stimme aus dem Hut (1959) — (based on a play by Berkely Mather)
 Wer überlebt, ist schuldig (1960) — (screenplay by Axel Eggebrecht)
 Bedienung, bitte! (1960) — (based on Room Service)
 Die Friedhöfe (1960) — (based on The Graveyard by Marek Hłasko)
 Parkstraße 13 (1960) — (based on a play by )
 Brennpunkt (1961) — (based on Focus)
 Karol (1962) — (based on a play by Sławomir Mrożek)
 Nachruf auf Jürgen Trahnke (1962) — (screenplay by )
 Der Gefangene (1962) — (remake of Bridget Boland's The Prisoner, 1955)
 Die Revolution entlässt ihre Kinder (1962) — (based on a non-fiction book by Wolfgang Leonhard)
 Der Schlaf der Gerechten (1962) — (based on Das Brandopfer by Albrecht Goes)
 Warten auf Godot (1963) — (based on Waiting for Godot)
 Haben (1964) — (based on a play by Gyula Háy)
  (1964) — (based on Murke's Collected Silences)
 Nach Ladenschluss (1964) — (screenplay by )
 Die Schlinge (1964) — (remake of Marek Hłasko's Noose, 1958)
 Der neue Mann (1965) — (based on Patterns)
 Die Grenzziehung (1966) — (based on a play by Sławomir Mrożek)
 Unser Sohn Nicki (1966, TV miniseries)
 Herr Puntila und sein Knecht Matti (1966) — (based on Mr Puntila and his Man Matti)
 Zuchthaus (1967) — (based on a novel by Henry Jaeger)
 Kraft des Gesetzes (1968) — (based on a play by )
  (1968)
 Von Mäusen und Menschen (1968) — (based on Of Mice and Men)
 Graf Öderland (1968) — (based on a play by Max Frisch)
 Alma Mater (1969) — (screenplay by )
 Jana (1970) — (screenplay by )
 Biografie: Ein Spiel (1970) — (based on a play by Max Frisch)
 Kennen Sie Georg Linke? (1971) — (screenplay by )
 Die Stimme hinter dem Vorhang (1971) — (based on he Voice Behind the Screen by Gottfried Benn)
 Erinnerung an einen Sommer in Berlin (1972) — (based on You Can't Go Home Again)
 Fischkonzert (1973) — (based on The Fish Can Sing)
  (1975, TV miniseries) — (based on Der Stechlin)
  (1978, TV series, co-directors: Günter Gräwert, Rainer Wolffhardt) — (based on a novel by Christine Brückner)
 Mach's gut, Florian (1978) — (screenplay by Michael Juncker)
  (1980, TV series, co-directors: Günter Gräwert, Rainer Wolffhardt) — (based on a novel by Christine Brückner)
 Das wiedergefundene Paradies (1980, TV miniseries) — (based on a novel by Halldór Laxness)
 Bergpredigt (1983) — (screenplay by )
 Backfischliebe (1985) — (based on Calf Love by Vernon Bartlett)
 Friedenspolka (1987) — (screenplay by Matthias Esche)
 Langusten (1989) — (based on a play by Fred Denger)

References

External links

1931 births
2000 deaths
Mass media people from Saxony
People from Zwickau